"St. Jean Baptiste" is French for John the Baptist. It is used in the names of some churches and places, and two other saints have names derived from him.

St. Jean-Baptiste de la Salle, the patron saint of teachers.
John Vianney, the patron saint of priests, sometimes styled St. Jean Baptiste Mary Vianney

Churches
St. Jean Baptiste Catholic Church, in New York City
St. Jean Baptiste High School, run by the church

Places
St. Jean Baptiste, Manitoba

Other
June 24 is celebrated as the Saint-Jean-Baptiste Day public holiday in Quebec, also known as the Fête nationale
See places with the name Saint-Jean-Baptiste